"Last Christmas" is a single released by Wham! in December 1984.

Last Christmas may also refer to:

"Last Christmas" (Doctor Who), a 2014 Doctor Who Christmas special
Last Christmas (film), a 2019 film
"Last Christmas" (This Is Us), an episode of the first season of This Is Us
"The Last Christmas", an episode of the eleventh season of Modern Family
Last Christmas!, an episode of Season 2 of DuckTales (2017)

See also
Lost Christmas, a 2011 film by John Hay